Palacagüina is a municipality in the Madriz department of Nicaragua.

Palacagüina is a small town; the name comes from the Nahuatl language, meaning "village near the mountains."

Palacagüina is featured in the revolutionary song "Cristo Ya Nació."

Municipalities of the Madriz Department